Jussi Länsitalo (born 30 June 1990) is a Finnish former professional footballer who played as a right winger.

Career
Länsitalo began his professional career with Lahti, and was the club top goalscorer in the 2013 Veikkausliiga season, before suffering a serious knee injury in a match against VPS in June 2013. In July 2014, he moved to German club FSV 08 Bissingen competing in the sixth-tier Verbandsliga Württemberg, where he would play while studying. He returned to Lahti in January 2015, and had a stint plagued by another knee injury, before retiring from football in December 2016, to become sales manager of the club.

References

External links
 Jussi Länsitalo at FC Lahti
 
 

1990 births
Living people
Sportspeople from Pori
Finnish footballers
Association football forwards
FC Schaffhausen players
FC Lahti players
Veikkausliiga players
Finnish expatriate footballers
Expatriate footballers in Germany
Finnish expatriate sportspeople in Germany